Westosha Central High School is a public high school located in the village of Paddock Lake, Wisconsin, United States, near the border of the village of Salem Lakes. It serves students in grades 9 through 12 in the communities of Wheatland, Salem, Brighton, Paris, Paddock Lake, Trevor, and Bristol, and open enrollment students from Kenosha and Racine. Parts of Trevor, Wheatland, and Salem are split between Central and neighboring Wilmot Union High School. The school was founded in 1952.

History 

Westosha Central High School was originally named Salem Central High School.  The name was changed to Westosha Central High School in the early 1980s, "Westosha" referring to the fact that the school was west of Kenosha as well as differentiating it from Walter Reuther Central High School, a special curriculum high school in nearby Kenosha. Westosha Central High School is usually referred to as "Central", whereas Walter Reuther Central High School is often called simply "Reuther."

Notable alumnus 
Ben Rothwell, graduated in 2001, professional mixed martial artist, current UFC Heavyweight

References

External links 
Westosha Central website

Public high schools in Wisconsin
Schools in Kenosha County, Wisconsin
Educational institutions established in 1952
1952 establishments in Wisconsin